The Department of Social Relations for Interdisciplinary Social Science Studies, more commonly known as the "Department of Social Relations", was an interdisciplinary collaboration among three of the social science departments at Harvard University (anthropology, psychology, and sociology) beginning in 1946. Originally, the program was headquartered in Emerson Hall at Harvard before moving to William James Hall in 1965. While the name "Social Relations" is often associated with the program's long-time chair and guiding spirit, sociologist Talcott Parsons, many major figures of mid-20th-century social science also numbered among the program's faculty, including psychologists Gordon Allport (personality and motivation), Jerome Bruner (cognitive psychology and narrative analysis), Roger Brown (social psychology and psycholinguistics), and Henry Murray (personality); anthropologists Clyde and Florence Kluckhohn (value orientations), John and Beatrice Whiting (cross-cultural child development), Evon Z. Vogt (comparative religion); and sociologist Alex Inkeles (Soviet studies and national character). Other prominent scholars, such as Jerome Kagan (developmental psychology) and Ezra Vogel (East Asia studies and sociology) belonged to the department early in their careers before it split. Many of the department's graduate students also went on to be major figures in US social sciences during the latter part of the twentieth century; their work tends towards strong interdisciplinary and cross-disciplinary approaches.

Allport and Boring discussed the origins of the department's name in the April 1946 issue of the American Psychologist:

Social Relations sponsored or collaborated in a number of research studies characterized by explicit cross-cultural comparisons and multidisciplinary approaches to problems of policy or social theory. Major projects included the Six Cultures Study (headed by John and Beatrice Whiting, an anthropological study of child development in six different cultures, including a New England Baptist community; a Philippine barrio; an Okinawan village; an Indian village in Mexico; a northern Indian caste group; and a rural tribal group in Kenya); a multidisciplinary analysis of Soviet culture and society, published in part as How the Soviet System Works; and the Comparative Study of Values in Five Cultures during the 1950s, which examined five very different communities living in the same region of Texas: Zuni, Navajo, Mormon (LDS), Spanish-American (Mexican-American), and Texas Homesteaders.

The curriculum of the Harvard Social Relations had four inter-related components:
 Sociology;
 Social Psychology;
 Social Anthropology; and
 Personality Theory.

The program disaggregated into its component departments around 1972, though a certain interdisciplinarity remained throughout the 1970s.

A similar program at Yale, the Institute for Human Relations, also now disbanded, developed the Human Relations Area Files (HRAF), a cross-cultural database for comparative research, administered by Carol and Melvin Ember.

Scholars associated with social relations at Harvard
Gordon Allport, (1897–1967) psychologist
Roger Brown, social psychologist
Jerome Bruner, psychologist
George Homans, sociologist
 Alex Inkeles, sociologist and scholar of national character
Clyde Kluckhohn, (1905–1960) anthropologist
Florence Rockwood Kluckhohn, anthropologist
Seymour Martin Lipset, sociologist
Eleanor Maccoby, developmental psychologist
Barrington Moore, sociologist
David McClelland, psychologist
Henry A. Murray, psychologist
Talcott Parsons, (1902–1979) sociologist
David Riesman, sociologist
Charles Tilly, (1929–2008), sociologist, historian, political scientist
Evon Z. Vogt, anthropologist
Harrison C. White, sociologist
Robert W. White, (1904–2001) personality psychologist
John Whiting (anthropologist), (1908–1999) anthropologist
Beatrice Blyth Whiting, (1914–2003) anthropologist

Notable graduates of social relations at Harvard
Robert N. Bellah, sociologist, American civil society
Bertram J. Cohler, (1938–2012) psychoanalyst and cultural psychologist
Roy G. D'Andrade, cognitive anthropologist
 Carol R. Ember, cultural anthropologist
Zelda Gamson, sociologist and educational reformer
Harold Garfinkel, (1917–2011) sociologist
Clifford Geertz, (1926–2006) cultural anthropologist
Mark Granovetter, sociologist
Janellen Huttenlocher, developmental and cognitive psychologist
Edward E. Jones, social psychologist
Nathan Kogan, social psychologist
Leon Kamin, experimental psychologist 
Edward O. Laumann, sociologist and sexologist
Jean Lipman-Blumen, sociologist and leadership scholar
Jean Mandler, cognitive psychologist
 Dan P. McAdams, social and personality psychologist
Stanley Milgram, (1933–1984) social psychologist
Richard Price (American anthropologist)
Michelle Zimbalist Rosaldo, (1944–1981) feminist theorist and psychological anthropologist
Renato Rosaldo, cultural anthropologist
Barbara Rogoff, developmental and cultural psychologist
Richard A. Shweder, psychological anthropologist and cultural psychologist
Neil Smelser, sociologist
Fred L. Strodtbeck, (1919–2005) social psychologist
Abby Stewart, personality and feminist psychologist
Marc J. Swartz, (1931–2011) cultural anthropologist
Charles Tilly, (1929–2008), sociologist, historian, political scientist
Michael Wallach, social psychologist
Barry Wellman, (1942–), sociologist

Interlocutors
 Irvin L. Child, (1915–2000) psychologist (Yale)
 Melvin Ember, (1933–2009) cultural anthropologist (Yale)
Edward Shils, (1911–1995) sociologist (University of Chicago)

Selected publications
Bauer, Raymond A., Alex Inkeles, and Clyde Kluckhohn. 1956. How the Soviet System Works: cultural, psychological, and social themes. New York: Vintage.
Homans, George Caspar. 1984. Coming to My Senses: The Autobiography of a Sociologist. Medford, MA: Routledge.
Inkeles, Alex; with D.J. Levinson; Helen Beier; Eugenia Hanfman; Larry Diamond. 1997. National Character: a psycho-social perspective. New Brunswick, NJ: Transaction Publishers.
Kluckhohn, Florence Rockwood and Fred L. Strodtbeck. 1961. Variations in value orientations. Evanston, IL: Row, Peterson.
Munroe, Ruth H., Robert L. Munroe, Beatrice B. Whiting, eds. 1981. Handbook of cross-cultural human development. New York: Garland.
Parsons, Talcott. 1949. The Structure of Social Action. Glencoe, IL: The Free Press.
Parsons, Talcott  and Edward Shils. 1951. Toward a General Theory of Action. Cambridge, Massachusetts: Harvard University Press.
Vogt, Evon Zartman and Ethel M. Albert Vogt. 1966. People of Rimrock; a study of values in five cultures. Cambridge, Massachusetts: Harvard University Press.
Whiting, Beatrice and John Whiting. 1975. Children of Six Cultures: a psychocultural analysis. Cambridge, Massachusetts: Harvard University Press.

References

External links
Further reading:
  History of the Harvard Psychology Department
 Social Relations at Harvard after Seventeen Years
William James Hall

Anthropology organizations
Psychology departments in the United States
Harvard University
Educational institutions established in 1946
1946 establishments in Massachusetts